Marisol is a Mexican telenovela produced by Juan Osorio for Televisa in 1996. Telenovela is a remake of the 1977 Mexican telenovela Marcha nupcial. Famous and beloved Enrique Álvarez Félix died after he finished his work in Marisol.

Erika Buenfil and Eduardo Santamarina starred as protagonists, while Claudia Islas, Enrique Álvarez Félix, Aarón Hernán, Irma Lozano, Germán Robles, Laura Flores, Emma Laura, Renée Varsi, Sergio Basañez and Pilar Montenegro starred as antagonists.

Plot 
Marisol has a pain-ridden life. She has a disfiguring scar on her face from a piece of a broken mirror she had fallen on when she was a little girl. Her mother is dying and Marisol must sell paper flowers to make money in order to support herself and her mother.

Sofia, Marisol's mother, is carrying a heavy secret and she realizes she must tell Marisol the truth before she dies and leaves her alone (especially with Marisol's sleazy boyfriend Mario).

Unfortunately, Sofia dies without revealing that Marisol is really the granddaughter of Don Alonso Garcés del Valle, the patriarch of a very rich family, which includes the handsome and amiable painter, José Andrés, also one of Alonso's grandchildren, or is he?.

To complicate matters, José Andrés and Marisol fall in love with each other (even though they are engaged to other people), both completely in the dark about their true identities.

Cast 
Erika Buenfil as Marisol Ledesma Garcés del Valle/Verónica Soriano - In love with José Andrés, granddaughter of Don Alonso, dedicated daughter of Sofia and Alfredo and niece of Leonardo
Eduardo Santamarina as José Andrés Garcés del Valle López - Son of Amparo and Mariano, in love with Marisol
Claudia Islas as Amparo López Vda. de Garcés del Valle - Main villain, mother of José Andrés, multiple murderer, wife of Leonardo, lover of Mariano and Mario. Together with Leonardo, Mariano, Mario and Zulema she attempts to kill Marisol. Was sent to a mental hospital, where she commits suicide by jumping out of the window.
Enrique Álvarez Félix† as Leonardo Garcés del Valle - Husband of Amparo. He thinks José Andrés is his son. Was a villain at first, but later was good. Dies after a heart attack.
Aarón Hernán as Don Alonso Garcés del Valle - Father of Leonardo and Sofía, grandfather of Marisol, dies by disease
Emma Laura as Rosana Valverde - Wife of José Andrés, lover of Mario, killed and murdered by Sulema
David Ostrosky as Mariano Ruiz - Biological father of José Andrés, villain, later good, dies off-screen
Pilar Montenegro as Sulema Chávez - Lover of Mario, villain, goes to jail.
Sergio Basañez as Mario Suárez Maldonado - Son of Rosita, lover of Sulema and Amparo and Rosana, almost killed Marisol, dies from HIV
Alejandro Ibarra as Francisco "Paco" Suárez Maldonado - Brother of Mario, husband of Mimí
Socorro Bonilla as Doña Rosita Maldonado Vda. de Suárez - Mother of Mario and Paco
Romina Castro as Mimí Candela de Suárez - Best friend of Marisol, in love and married with Paco
Germán Robles as Basilio González - Don Alonso’s chauffeur, killed by Amparo
Verónica Langer as Carmen López Vda. de Pedroza - Sister of Amparo, in love with Mariano
Paulina Lazareno as Alejandra Pedroza López - Daughter of Carmen
Irma Lozano† as Sofía Garcés del Valle de Ledesma - Mother of Marisol, sister of Leonardo, daughter of Alonso (dies)
Alberto Insua as Alfredo Ledesma - Father of Marisol, killed by Amparo
Julia Marichal† as Dolores 
Alberto Mayagoitía as Rubén Linares 
Ivette as Camila Linares
José María Torre as Daniel "Danny" Linares
Guillermo Murray as Dr. Álvaro Linares
 
Ana María Aguirre as Rebeca
Alejandra Procuna as Malú
Amparo Garrido as Constanza
Blanca Torres as Blanca
Laura Flores as Sandra Luján - Biological mother of Vanessa, villain, later good
Christian Ruiz as José María Garcés del Valle "Chema"- Biological son of Marisol and José Andrés, kidnapped by Mario and Sulema, after 18 years reunites with Marisol and José Andrés
Renée Varsi as Vanessa Garcés del Valle - Adoptive daughter of Marisol, villain, commits suicide
Raymundo Capetillo as Diego Montalvo - Biological father of Vanessa, killed by Amparo
Maricarmen Vela as Doña Andrea Vda. de Montalvo
Guillermo García Cantú as Raúl Montemar
Teresa Tuccio as Sabrina Montemar
Jair de Rubin as Daniel Martínez "El Chupacabras"
Anastasia as Yolanda "Yoli"
Alejandra Meyer as  Doña Lorenza
Guillermo Rivas as Don Tomás
Lucía Guilmáin as Romualda Martínez
Cocó Ortiz as Raymunda Martínez
Yadira Santana as Mariana
Laura Forastieri as Wilma
Chao as Óscar
Oscar Márquez as Leonel Villanueva
Grelda Cobo as Angélica
Antonio De Carlo as Rosendo
Serrana as Teresa
Nikky as Jesús
Guadalupe Bolaños as Dorina Capucci
Marcos Valdés as Dr. Salvador Saldívar
Francisco Xavier as Alberto Montiel
Alma Rosa Añorve as Déborah de Valverde
Teo Tapia as Rodolfo Valverde
Montalvo "El Pirata de la Salsa" as Lalo
Carolina Guerrero as Lola
Rodolfo Arias as Nicolás Mijares
Michaelle Mayer as Rosario "Chayito"
Nora Velázquez as Petra
Luhana as Chole
Verónika con K. as Zalmudia
Lilian Tapia as Gelatina
Sherlyn González as Sofía Garcés del Valle "Piojito" Adoptive daughter of Marisol and José Andrés
Antonio Escobar as Larry García
Raúl Askenazi as Teniente Romero
Rafael Perrin as Detective Aguilar
Miguel Ángel Fuentes as Pulga
Miguel Garza as Piojo
Raúl Valerio as Dr. Heredia
Víctor Lozada as Toto
Abigail Martínez as Genoveva
Jorge Santos as Dr. Samuel Reyna
Nando Estevané as Silvano Suárez
Brenda Zachas as Acasia
Alfredo Rosas as Cástulo
Marco Antonio Calvillo as Omar
Flor Payan as Esmeralda "Melita"
Nieves Mogas as Herlinda
Soraya as Guadalupe
María Prado as Doña Chancla
Fernando Lozano as Sebastián
Adriana Chapela as Clara
Judith Grace as Carola
Emmanuel Ortiz as Claudio
Nancy Curiel as Carmín
Jesús Ochoa as Don Fortunato
Maunel Ávila Córdoba as Dr. Santos
Manuel Benítez as Μr. Morales
José Luis Avendaño as Serafín
Alicia del Lago as Cleotilde
Abril Campillo as Teófila Vda. de Gamboa
Héctor Fuentes León as Julián
María Marmolejo as Altagracia #1
Mariana Rivera as Altagracia #2
Jamye Post as Heidi
Bernhard Seifert as Hans
Alberto Seeman as Dr. Silva
Fernando Sarfati as Lic. Cabrera
Ofelia Guilmáin as Zamira
Gabriela Salomón as Domitila
Miguel Serros as Ballesteros
Alejandro Ávila as Castello
Mario Suárez as Quijano
Ángeles Balvanera as Lola
Silvia Ramírez as Sonia
Martín Rojas as Manolo
Héctor Álvarez as Dr. García
Raúl Castellanos as Child
Víctor Foulloms as Joyero
Gustavo Zárate as Dueño
Néstor Leoncio as Man
Ely Mauri as Police
Omar Germenos as Medical
Alberto Langer as Journalist
Roberto Porter as Priest
Monique Rojkind as Nurse
Dolores Salomón "Bodokito" as Mrs. Gordoa
Arturo Peniche as Juan Vicente Morelos
Radamés de Jesús as Tootie
Verónica Gallardo as Herself
Enrique Iglesias as Himself
Ángeles Yáñez

Awards

References

External links

1996 telenovelas
Mexican telenovelas
1996 Mexican television series debuts
1996 Mexican television series endings
Spanish-language telenovelas
Television shows set in Mexico City
Television shows set in Monterrey
Television shows set in Houston
Televisa telenovelas